Jerome Sarris is Co-Director of Psychae Institute, Professor of Integrative Mental Health at Western Sydney University, Australia, and a visiting scientist at the Florey Institute of Neuroscience and Mental Health at the University of Melbourne, Australia.

Sarris' principal research interests pertain to the development and clinical study of psychedelic therapies and  cannabinoids for mental disorders and other diseases. He is also interested in lifestyle medicine in anxiety and mood disorders, psychotropic plant medicines (such as kava), as well as the use of pharmacogenetics to guide psychiatric treatment. He is involved in prominent research projects investigating the therapeutic potential of psychedelic medicines.

Early life

Jerome Sarris was born in Sydney, Australia. He was raised on the North Shore of Sydney and attended Mosman Preparatory School. After moving to Brisbane at age 9, Sarris attended Ironside State School, then Brisbane Boys College. At age 17, Sarris lived in Glastonbury, England, for several years before  returning to Brisbane to pursue further study. Sarris' heritage is primarily Austrian, German and French, and he has a great grandmother from the Polynesian Gilbertese Islands.

Academic career

Sarris has completed advanced diplomas and degrees in western herbal medicine, naturopathy (including the study of clinical medicine), acupuncture and nutrition, and has practiced clinically in these areas. During this period of clinical practice, Sarris obtained a master's degree majoring in plant-based medicine under Kerry Bone at the University of New England, Australia. Sarris then completed a doctorate in the field of psychiatry at the University of Queensland under the mentorship of Professors David Kavanagh and Gerard Byrne. After receiving a National Health and Medical Research Council (NHMRC) Early Career Fellowship he undertook his postdoctoral training at the University of Melbourne, under the mentorship of Professor Isaac Schweitzer. His post-doctoral studies were also based at The Centre of Human Psychopharmacology at Swinburne University of Technology with Con Stough and Andrew Scholey, as well as The Depression Clinical Research program at Harvard Medical School with David Mischoulon. Sarris is currently Co-Director of Psychae Institute with A/Prof Daniel Perkins, visiting scientist at the Florey Institute of Neuroscience and Mental Health, and leads the Healthy Minds Research Theme at NICM Health Research Institute.

Research and scientific contributions

Sarris is currently involved in prominent research projects investigating the therapeutic use of psychedelic medicines (including Psilocybin and Ayahuasca) and medical cannabis. He is a principal investigator on the Global Ayahuasca Project, has published several research studies investigating the use of psychedelic medicines in psychiatric conditions, and is a founding member of the Medicinal Psychedelics Research Network at the University of Melbourne. Sarris is Chair of the Integrative and Complementary Medicine Task Force of the World Federation of Societies of Biological Psychiatry. 

Previously, Sarris' main research contributions have been in the areas of integrative mental health, nutritional psychiatry and in the development of evidence-based practice in naturopathy. He has co-authored a textbook, and published many highly cited papers in these fields.  His work  has impacted treatment guidelines for mood and anxiety disorders. Sarris has advocated for a more integrated model of treatment of depression, involving an evidence-based application of select nutraceuticals and lifestyle modification, alongside mainstream judicious use of pharmacotherapies and psychological techniques. Sarris has been a prominent figure in the investigation of South Pacific psychotropic medicinal plant kava (Piper methysticum), playing an assistance role in the direction of kava policy at the Australian Therapeutic Goods Administration. He has conducted several RCTs in anxiety and mood disorder involving extracts of this plant. His research on traditional water-extracted noble cultivars of the plant has influenced the safety guidelines around usage and development of such extracts for the treatment of anxiety. Sarris was on the executive committee of The International Network of Integrative Mental Health, The International Society for Nutritional Psychiatry Research, and the Australian Medicinal Cannabis Research and Education Collaboration (co-founded with Justin Sinclair).

References

Year of birth missing (living people)
Living people
University of Queensland alumni
University of New England (Australia) alumni
Australian psychiatrists
Academic staff of Western Sydney University